The Belly Dancer and the Politician (translit. Al Raqisa wa Al Siyasy) is an Egyptian film released in 1990.

Plot
Based on a novel by Ihsan Abdel Quddous, the film discusses the eternal conflict of power and authority, symbolized by the love affair between a politician and a belly dancer, revealing the corruption of a system where it becomes difficult to decide which has more integrity, the politician or the dancer.

Cast
 Nabila Ebeid 
 Salah Kabil
 Farouk Falawkas
 Ahmed Akl
 Fatima Fouad
 Nora Charles
 Suhair Tawfik
 Najwa Rabie
 Enas Shalaby
 Mervat el-Shennawy
 Hamdi Salam
 Saleh al-Aweel

External links
 IMDb page
 El Cinema page
 Archive of El Film page

References

Egyptian drama films
Films set in Egypt
1990s Arabic-language films
1990 films